Dean Peter "The Dream" Meminger (May 13, 1948 – August 23, 2013) was an American basketball player and coach.

Early life
Meminger was born in Walterboro, South Carolina, and came to Harlem, New York, with his family as a seventh-grader. He starred at Rice High School in New York City as well as making a name for himself on the playgrounds at West 135th Street.

College career
Meminger attended Marquette University, where he played for coach Al McGuire with the then-Warriors. He helped Marquette win the 1970 National Invitational Tournament. Marquette's 1970 team was ranked 8th in the country and was invited to the NCAA tournament. Following a dispute whether to play in the Mid-East or Mid-West Regional, Marquette declined the bid and opted to play in the NIT, where the team outclassed the field. The NCAA was so incensed by Marquette, it instituted a rule that forced an NCAA Division I team to accept an NCAA bid over an NIT bid. A subsequent antitrust case brought by the NIT against the NCAA over this issue was later settled out of court. Meminger was also the MVP of the 1970 National Invitation Tournament, in which Marquette beat Pete Maravich and LSU 101–79 in the semi-finals before defeating St. John's 65–53 in the title game. During his varsity career, he never  lost a home game.

NBA career
Meminger was drafted in the first round (16th overall) of the 1971 NBA Draft by the New York Knicks, with whom he played from 1971 to 1974 and 1976-1977. As a rookie reserve guard in 1971–72, Meminger averaged 4.6 points in 15 minutes per game, followed by 5.7 points in 18 minutes per game in 1972–73. In that season, Meminger helped the Knicks win their second-ever NBA championship. Playing on a team which featured star guards Walt Frazier, Earl Monroe and Dick Barnett, in Game 7 of the 1973 Eastern Conference finals he replaced Monroe in the second quarter, frustrated the hot-shooting Boston Celtics guard Jo Jo White and scored 13 points. After knocking the Celtics out of the playoffs, the Knicks beat the Los Angeles Lakers for the title. In the postseason, Meminger played in all 17 games for the Knicks, making 31 of 56 field goal attempts for a  percentage.

In Meminger's third season of 1973–74, his playing time increased to 26.7 minutes per game as he averaged 8.3 points and 3.6 rebounds per game (both career highs) and 2.1 assists.

In 1974–75, Meminger played for the Atlanta Hawks, averaging career highs of 27.2 minutes, 5.0 rebounds and 1.5 steals per game in addition to 7.9 points per game. In 1975–76 with the Hawks, his fifth NBA season, in just over 20 minutes per game he averaged 6.0 points and 3.3 assists per game.

The 1976–77 season was his sixth and final NBA season as he returned to the Knicks and averaged 7.9 minutes per game.

Coaching career
Meminger was head coach of the New York Stars in the Women's Professional Basketball League (abbreviated WBL), which played three seasons from the fall of 1978 to the spring of 1981. Meminger, with rookie trainer Rick Capistran at his side, guided the Stars to the league championship during the 1979–80 season and was named the league's coach of the year. The team's great success, however, was not enough to save the Stars, which lost so much money the team folded without being able to repeat as champions. Meminger was coaxed to head west, leaving Capistran behind, when he signed up to coach the San Francisco Pioneers in what would be the league's final season.

Among the players Meminger coached to a championship were twins Faye and Kaye Young, fresh out of North Carolina State University. Kaye was married to former Pittsburgh Steelers head coach Bill Cowher. Kaye Cowher died of skin cancer at age 54 on July 23, 2010.

In 1982 Meminger was hired to coach the Albany Patroons in the Continental Basketball Association. He was dismissed for his combative style with his players and replaced by his former Knicks teammate and friend Phil Jackson. Meminger convinced Jackson to let him try out for the team but he was unable to resurrect his career on the court.

Meminger coached the USBL's Long Island Knights in 1987, and in later years, spent some time coaching at Manhattanville College in New York.

Personal life
Meminger's son goes by the same name and is a news reporter and anchor for NY1 News.

On November 22, 2009, Meminger was rescued from a fire in the Bronx in New York City. Suffering from smoke inhalation, he was admitted to the burn unit of Jacobi Medical Center. Meminger recovered and would remain active in local basketball events. He and trainer Rick Capistran reconnected after 30 years when Capistran tracked his old coach down after reading about Meminger's brush with death in the fire.

Meminger had battled drug addiction for decades and was living in Baltimore, Maryland. He was in Harlem to receive a community award when he was found dead in his room at the Casablanca Hotel in Harlem on August 23, 2013.

References

External links
 
NBA statistics @ basketballreference.com
Mad Season: The Story of the First Women's Professional Basketball League, 1978-1981 by Karra Porter

1948 births
2013 deaths
African-American basketball players
African-American basketball coaches
All-American college men's basketball players
American men's basketball players
Atlanta Hawks players
Basketball coaches from South Carolina
Basketball players from South Carolina
Burials at Woodlawn Cemetery (Bronx, New York)
Continental Basketball Association coaches
Marquette Golden Eagles men's basketball players
New Orleans Jazz expansion draft picks
New York Knicks draft picks
New York Knicks players
Parade High School All-Americans (boys' basketball)
People from Walterboro, South Carolina
Point guards
United States Basketball League coaches
20th-century African-American sportspeople
21st-century African-American people
Women's Professional Basketball League coaches